Câmp may refer to several places in Romania:

 Câmp, a village in the town of Vașcău, Bihor County
 Câmp, a village in Urmeniș Commune, Bistrița-Năsăud County
 Câmp (river), a tributary of the Uz in Bacău County

See also
 Camp (disambiguation)